Prem Geet may refer to:
 Prem Geet (1981 film), an Indian Hindi-language film
 Prem Geet (2016 film), a Nepalese romantic comedy film